James Clifton of Mar, 30th Earl of Mar (22 November 1914 – 21 April 1975) was a British peer.

He was born James Clifton Lane, and was officially recognized in the style of Mar by warrant of the Lord Lyon in 1959 on being recognised as the heir presumptive of Lionel Erskine-Young, 29th Earl of Mar, his first cousin once removed (both he and the 29th Earl were descended from a sister of John Goodeve-Erskine, 27th Earl of Mar), and from then on was known as The Master of Mar, until he succeeded as 30th Earl in 1965.

His only son, David, Master of Mar, Lord Garioch, died in 1967, and when Lord Mar died in 1975 he was succeeded by his elder daughter, Margaret of Mar, Mistress of Mar.

Family 
He married, firstly, Millicent Mary Salton, daughter of William Salton, on 1 March 1939 and had one son and two daughters:
 Margaret of Mar, 31st Countess of Mar (born 1940)
 David Charles of Mar, Lord Garioch (1944–1967)
 Lady Janet of Mar (born 1946)

He and Millicent Mary Salton were divorced in 1958.

He married, secondly, Marjorie Aileen Miller, daughter of John Reginald Miller, in 1960.

References 

1914 births
1975 deaths
20th-century Scottish people
Earls or mormaers of Mar
Dukes of Mar
Lords Erskine